The mixed team  compound archery competition at the 2017 World Games took place from 29 to 30 July 2017 at the AWF Witelona in Wrocław, Poland.

Competition format
A total of 8 teams competed in this competition. After ranking round teams were divided into pairs in the cup system.

Results

Ranking round

Competition bracket

References 

Mixed team compound